The 2020 Estonian Athletics Championships was the 103rd edition of the national championship in outdoor track and field for athletes in Estonia. It was held between 8–9 August at the Kadriorg Stadium in Tallinn. The 10,000 metres races were held separately on 19 July. The competition was scheduled for earlier in the year to serve as qualification for the 2020 European Athletics Championships, but was postponed due to the COVID-19 pandemic.

Results

Men

Women

References

Results
 103. Eesti meistrivõistlused. Estonian Athletics Federation. Retrieved 2021-03-20.

External links
Estonian Athletics Association website

2020
Estonian Championships
Estonian Athletics Championships
Sports competitions in Tallinn
Estonian Athletics Championships, 2020